A quantum limit in physics is a limit on measurement accuracy at quantum scales.  Depending on the context, the limit may be absolute (such as the Heisenberg limit), or it may only apply when the experiment is conducted with naturally occurring quantum states (e.g. the standard quantum limit in interferometry) and can be circumvented with advanced state preparation and measurement schemes.

The usage of the term standard quantum limit or SQL is, however, broader than just interferometry. In principle, any linear measurement of a quantum mechanical observable of a system under study that does not commute with itself at different times leads to such limits. In short, it is the Heisenberg uncertainty principle that is the cause.

A more detailed explanation would be that any measurement in quantum mechanics involves at least two parties, an Object and a Meter. The former is the system whose observable, say , we want to measure. This, in a nutshell, is a model of most of the measurements happening in physics, known as indirect measurements (see pp. 38–42 of ). So any measurement is a result of interaction and that acts in both ways. Therefore, the Meter acts on the Object during each measurement, usually via the quantity, conjugate to the readout observable , thus perturbing the value of measured observable  and modifying the results of subsequent measurements. This is known as back action (quantum) of the Meter on the system under measurement.

At the same time, quantum mechanics prescribes that readout observable of the Meter should have an inherent uncertainty, additive to and independent of the value of the measured quantity . This one is known as measurement imprecision or measurement noise. Because of the Heisenberg uncertainty principle, this imprecision cannot be arbitrary and is linked to the back-action perturbation by the uncertainty relation:

The equality is reached if the system is in a minimum uncertainty state. Therefore, the readout of the meter will, in general, consist of three terms:

The terms "quantum limit" and "standard quantum limit" are sometimes used interchangeably.  Usually, "quantum limit" is a general term which refers to any restriction on measurement due to quantum effects, while the "standard quantum limit" in any given context refers to a quantum limit which is ubiquitous in that context.

Examples

Displacement measurement
Consider a very simple measurement scheme, which, nevertheless, embodies all key features of a general position measurement. In the scheme shown in the Figure, a sequence of very short light pulses are used to monitor the displacement of a probe body . We assume mass  large enough to neglect the displacement inflicted by the pulses regular (classical) radiation pressure in the course of measurement process.

Then each -th pulse, when reflected, carries a phase shift proportional to the value of the test-mass position  at the moment of reflection:

The reflected pulses are detected by a phase-sensitive device (the phase detector).

In this example, light pulse phase  serves as the readout observable  of the Meter. Then we suppose that the phase  measurement error introduced by the detector is much smaller than the initial uncertainty of the phases . In this case, the initial uncertainty will be the only source of the position measurement error:

For convenience, we renormalise Eq. as the equivalent test-mass displacement:

where

are the independent random values with the RMS uncertainties given by Eq..

Upon reflection, each light pulse kicks the test mass, transferring to it a back-action momentum equal to

The major part of this perturbation is contributed by classical radiation pressure:

with  the mean energy of the pulses. Therefore, one could neglect its effect, for it could be either subtracted from the measurement result or compensated by an actuator. The random part, which cannot be compensated, is proportional to the deviation of the pulse energy:

and its RMS uncertainly is equal to

with  the RMS uncertainty of the pulse energy.

Assuming the mirror is free (which is a fair approximation if time interval between pulses is much shorter than the period of suspended mirror oscillations), one can estimate an additional displacement caused by the back action of the -th pulse that will contribute to the uncertainty of the subsequent measurement by the  pulse time  later:

Its uncertainty will be simply

where we assumed all contributions to our measurement uncertainty statistically independent and thus got sum uncertainty by summation of standard deviations. If we further assume that all light pulses are similar and have the same phase uncertainty, thence .

Now, what is the minimum this sum and what is the minimum error one can get in this simple estimate? The answer ensues from quantum mechanics, if we recall that energy and the phase of each pulse are canonically conjugate observables and thus obey the following uncertainty relation:

Therefore, it follows from Eqs. ( and ) that the position measurement error  and the momentum perturbation  due to back action also satisfy the uncertainty relation:

Taking this relation into account, the minimal uncertainty, the light pulse should have in order not to perturb the mirror too much, should be equal to  yielding for both . Thus the minimal displacement measurement error that is prescribed by quantum mechanics read:

This is the Standard Quantum Limit for such a 2-pulse procedure. In principle, if we limit our measurement to two pulses only and do not care about perturbing mirror position afterwards, the second pulse measurement uncertainty,  can, in theory, be reduced to 0 (it will yield, of course) and the limit of displacement measurement error will reduce to:

which is known as the Standard Quantum Limit for the measurement of free mass displacement.

This example represents a simple particular case of a linear measurement.

Usage in quantum optics
In the context of interferometry or other optical measurements, the standard quantum limit usually refers to the minimum level of quantum noise which is obtainable without squeezed states.

There is additionally a quantum limit for phase noise, reachable only by a laser at high noise frequencies.

In spectroscopy, the shortest wavelength in an X-ray spectrum is called the quantum limit.

Misleading relation to the classical limit
Note that due to an overloading of the word "limit", the classical limit is not the opposite of the quantum limit.  In "quantum limit", "limit" is being used in the sense of a physical limitation (e.g. the Armstrong limit).  In "classical limit", "limit" is used in the sense of a limiting process.  (Note that there is no simple rigorous mathematical limit which fully recovers classical mechanics from quantum mechanics, the Ehrenfest theorem notwithstanding. Nevertheless, in the phase space formulation of quantum mechanics, such limits are more systematic and practical.)

See also
Classical limit
Heisenberg limit
Ultrarelativistic limit

References and Notes

Quantum mechanics